Dronfield Town Ladies Football Club is an English women's football club based in Dronfield, Derbyshire.

History

Season by season record

References

Women's football clubs in England
Sheffield & Hallamshire County FA members